Wild Child is the second studio album by Valerie Carter. Some notable musicians on this album are Steve Porcaro, Jeff Porcaro, David Hungate and Steve Lukather of Toto, Mike Utley of Jimmy Buffett's Coral Reefer Band, Jay Graydon of Airplay, Davey Johnstone of the Elton John Band, Verdine White of Earth Wind & Fire and Ray Parker Jr.

The album was finally reissued in full as part of the 2019 compilation Ooh Child - The Columbia Years on Cherry Tree Records.

Critical reception

Stephen Thomas Erlewine of AllMusic writes that Wild Child "never transcends its time, except for the most hardcore soft-rock collectors."

Charles Donovan of Pop Matters wrote of Wild Child in his tribute article to Valerie Carter that, "Her name appeared in the songwriting credits of roughly half the tracks. To some, it's the poor relation, with its disco-pop compromises, its studio wizards (James Newton Howard), its ultra-slick session players and commercial sheen. I've always liked it."

Joe Marchese of The Second Disc writes of Wild Child, "The versatile singer-songwriter had a hand in five of its nine songs compared to just three on the previous LP, making Wild Child arguably a more personal album despite the sleek production.  The lyrics to the ironically upbeat opening track, "Crazy," may have cut too close to the bone for an artist who battled her share of personal demons over the years: "I'm always gonna be this way/Reckless and crazy/That's probably true…"  An authenticity, not to mention confidence, surges though the album."

Smash Hits called it, "An accomplished American album of gentle, shuffling songs done Fleetwood Mac style. It's all a bit to effortless to be actually wild, but this album has a wistful, haunting beauty."

Track listing

Track information verified from the LP's liner notes and Session Days.

Musicians

"Crazy"
Vocals – Valerie Carter
Bass – David Hungate
Drums – Jeff Porcaro
Guitar – Steve Lukather
Keyboards – James Newton Howard
Keyboards – Steve Porcaro
Percussion – Victor Feldman

"Da Doo Rendezvous"
Vocals – Valerie Carter
Bass – Chuck Rainey
Drums – Jeff Porcaro
Guitar (solo) – Ray Parker Jr.
Guitar – Steve Lukather
Acoustic Guitar – Fred Tackett
Keyboards – James Newton Howard
Keyboards – Steve Porcaro

"What’s Become Of Us"
Vocals – Valerie Carter
Bass – David Hungate
Drums – Jeff Porcaro
Guitar – Jay Graydon
Guitar – Fred Tackett
Keyboards – James Newton Howard
Percussion – Victor Feldman
Background Vocals – Vini Poncia
Background Vocals – Wendy Haas

"Taking The Long Way Home"
Vocals – Valerie Carter
Bass – Chuck Rainey
Drums – Jeff Porcaro
Guitar – Steve Lukather
Acoustic Guitar – Fred Tackett
Keyboards – James Newton Howard
Sax – Don Myrick
Background Vocals – David Lasley

"Lady In The Dark"
Vocals – Valerie Carter
Bass – David Hungate
Drums – Jeff Porcaro
Guitar (solo) – Steve Lukather
Piano – James Newton Howard

"The Story Of Love"
Vocals – Valerie Carter
Bass – Verdine White
Drums – Jeff Porcaro
Guitar – Steve Lukather
Piano – James Newton Howard
Sax – Tom Saviano

"The Blue Side"
Vocals – Valerie Carter
Bass – David Hungate
Drums – Jeff Porcaro
Guitar – Jay Graydon
Guitar – Davey Johnstone
Piano – James Newton Howard
Percussion – Lenny Castro
Background Vocals – David Lasley

"Change In Luck"
Vocals – Valerie Carter
Bass – Chuck Rainey
Drums – Jeff Porcaro
Guitar – Steve Lukather
Organ – Mike Utley
Piano – Victor Feldman
Piano – James Newton Howard
Percussion – Lenny Castro

"Trying To Get To You"
Vocals – Valerie Carter
Bass – Verdine White
Drums – Jeff Porcaro
Guitar – Steve Lukather
Piano – James Newton Howard
Horn – Jim Horn
Horn – Steve Madaio
Sax – Don Myrick
Trumpet – Chuck Findley
Background Vocals – David Lasley

"Wild Child"
Vocals – Valerie Carter
Bass – David Hungate
Drums – Jeff Porcaro
Guitar – Steve Lukather
Acoustic Guitar – Fred Tackett
Piano – Victor Feldman
Percussion – Victor Feldman

Production

Producer – James Newton Howard
Arranged By, Horns – Thomas Washington
Arranged By, Strings – James Newton Howard
Arranged By, Strings, Conductor – Jimmy Haskell
Concertmaster – Jimmy Getzoff, Sid Sharp
Design – Nancy Donald, Tony Lane
Engineer – Tom Knox
Assistant Engineers – Bob Schaper, Dana Latham, Howard Steele, Jim Isaacson, Kevin Meyers, Rick Ruggiere, Ron Hitchcock
Management – Cavallo-Ruffalo Management
Mastered By – Doug Sax, Mike Reese
Photography By – Sam Emerson
Photography By, Cover – Bob Seidemann
Production Manager – Robin Rinehart
Remix, Engineer – Bill Schnee

Personnel information retrieved from Discogs, Session Days and AllMusic.

References

External links
Valerie Carter Official Site
Columbia Records Official Site

1978 albums
Columbia Records albums